The House in Montevideo is a 1951 West German comedy film directed by Curt Goetz and Valérie von Martens and starring Goetz, von Martens, Albert Florath and Lia Eibenschütz. It is an adaptation of Goetz's 1945 comic play The House in Montevideo. Goetz and von Martens had frequently played the lead parts on the stage. The play was later adapted into another film of the same title in 1963.

It was shot at the Göttingen Studios and on location at Cuxhaven and the Uruguayan capital Montevideo. The film's sets were designed by the art director Emil Hasler.

Cast
Curt Goetz as Professor Traugott Nägler
Valérie von Martens as Marianne Nägler
Albert Florath as Pastor Riesling
Lia Eibenschütz as Madame de la Rocco
John Mylong as Anwalt
Ruth Niehaus as Atlanta Nägler
Eckart Dux as Herbert Kraft
Rudolf Reiff as Bürgermeister
Ingeborg Körner as Carmencita
Lope Rica as Belinda
Andrea Perkams as Marta
Günther Vogt as Parsifal Nägler
J. von Felbert as Lohengrin

Bibliography
 Bergfelder, Tim & Bock, Hans-Michael. The Concise Cinegraph: Encyclopedia of German. Berghahn Books, 2009.
 Fenner, Angelica. Race Under Reconstruction in German Cinema: Robert Stemmle's Toxi''. University of Toronto Press, 2011.

External links

1951 films
1951 comedy films
German comedy films
West German films
1950s German-language films
German films based on plays
Films based on works by Curt Goetz
Films set in Montevideo
Films directed by Curt Goetz
German black-and-white films
1950s German films
Films shot at Göttingen Studios